Rodney C. Moen is a former member of the Wisconsin State Senate.

Biography
Moen was born on July 26, 1937 in Whitehall, Wisconsin. He attended the Rochester Institute of Technology, Syracuse University, University of Southern California and Ball State University. Moen was an officer in the United States Navy for more than twenty years, including a tour of duty in the Vietnam War. He is married and has had five children.

Political career
Moen was a member of the Senate from 1983 to 2003 as a member of the Democratic Party. He served three terms as Assistant Majority Leader, two terms as Minority Caucus Chairperson and a term as Majority Caucus Chairperson.

References

People from Whitehall, Wisconsin
Democratic Party Wisconsin state senators
Military personnel from Wisconsin
United States Navy officers
Rochester Institute of Technology alumni
Syracuse University alumni
University of Southern California alumni
Ball State University alumni
1931 births
Living people